The Princess Royal Challenge Cup is a rowing event for women's single sculls at the annual Henley Royal Regatta on the River Thames at Henley-on-Thames in England.  It is open to all eligible female scullers.

History
In 1982 an invitation exhibition event for women's singles was added to the race programme. The start for this event was moved to Fawley so that the course was closer to 1000 m. As the intermediate start installations were required for the shorter distance, the races had to take place during intervals in the normal racing programme (the lunch or tea breaks) which meant that only the dedicated stayed to watch.

In the end, the final of the Women's Invitation Single was a highlight of the regatta, with Beryl Mitchell of Thames Tradesmen's Rowing Club (World Silver medallist in 1981) beating Stephanie Foster of Waiariki Rowing Club, New Zealand (World Bronze medallist in 1982) by one length.

Women's singles disappeared off the race programme until 1993 when an open Women's Single Sculls event, over the full course, was introduced. From 1993 to 1996 this counted as a round of the FISA World Cup.

The first winner was Maria Brandin of Sweden and she subsequently won a further four times. In 1996, the Stewards purchased a silver cup as a challenge trophy and named it the Princess Royal Challenge Cup; it was presented for the first time in 1997.

Winners

As Invitation Single Sculls

As Princess Royal Challenge Cup

References 

Events at Henley Royal Regatta
Rowing trophies and awards